is a Japanese manga series written by Shinya Murata and illustrated by Kazuasa Sumita. It has been serialized since November 2013 in Hero's Inc.'s seinen manga magazine Monthly Hero's. It has been collected in eighteen tankōbon volumes as of July 29, 2021. A 12-episode anime television series adaptation by Liden Films aired between January and March 2018 on MBS TV's "Animeism" programming block.

Plot
When attacked by some college students, Hitomi kills all of them except Yūya, who is shocked to see her transform into a beast and battle a lion monster at an abandoned waste facility. These strange people are "Brutes", fighters that have been created to combine the brains of humans and the fangs of beasts. The "Killing Bites" battles have been the decisive turning points in the Japanese economy since ancient times. Hitomi is assigned to protect Yūya.

Characters

A girl with white hair who is a honey badger (ratel) hybrid. Her honey badger DNA means she does not feel fear even when facing opponents far larger, stronger and faster than herself in death matches. Her fighting strategy usually involves insulting her opponents into attacking her first, then counterattacking with lethally fast slashing cuts. She has an obvious crush on her guardian, Reiichi Shido, becoming lovestruck in his presence and immediately following any order he gives her. She treats anybody but Reiichi with mild contempt and indifference, frequently forgetting people's names even if they are opponents she has fought in the past, such as Leo. After the Killing Bites tournament, Shido orders her to assassinate Nomoto, much to her resistance.

A second year university student who was forced into a plot by several classmates to kidnap Hitomi. Following this incident he is forced by Hitomi's guardian, Reiichi Shido, to allow Hitomi to live with him as his bodyguard. In return Yuya must act as Hitomi's financial backer to allow her to take part in death matches against Hybrids belonging to the four Zaibatsu. After the battles, Hitomi attempts to assassinate him, but survives. Learning that he is officially dead, Yuya takes refuge among the hybrids and plans his revenge against Shido and the Zaibatsu. After the series' timeskip, he becomes a Crow Hybrid and starts conspiring to get his vengeance against those who betrayed him, demonstrating a more mature and resolute personality. His feelings toward Hitomi, however, are the same as before and, even though he understands that he, Inui and Kuroi may have to face her one day, he still hopes her to survive and be free from Shido's influence.

She is a Cheetah hybrid specialising in speed type attacks. She is the younger sister of Taiga and represents the Yatsubishi Zaibatsu alongside her brother Taiga. She loses the final match of the first destroyal against Ui in a very unexpected way, and since then her main purpose is to get vengeance against her for having been humiliated in that occasion.

She is a Rabbit hybrid who has never won a fight and prefers to run away from danger. After the destroyal she becomes worldwide known as the strongest hybrid ever seen, and one of the most respected member of the underground and unrecognized Killing Bites matches. For the same reason however she becomes also a puppet for the elite controlling the new hybrids community, that can force her to do whatever they want to not see her secret about how she won the destroyal publicly revealed.

He is a burly man who is a Hippopotamus Hybrid. He represents the Ishida Zaibatsu with Seira Son as his sponsor.

Eruza's older brother and a Tiger hybrid. He represents the Yatsubishi Zaibatsu and sees Yuugo as his rival.

She is an overseer of the Death Matches.

Hitomi's legal guardian who orders her to live with and protect Yuya. He frequently uses Hitomi's crush on him to make her obey his orders without question or hesitation. He uses the Death Matches as the testing grounds for his own hybrid research. After obtaining power from the four zaibatsu, he orders Nomoto's assassination and orders Hitomi to execute him, as Nomoto knew too much as well as wanting Hitomi to remove all attachments; not realizing, he would soon make an enemy out of the young man.

She is a Beagle Hybrid. After a car accident, her dog Nanuupi's DNA has been joined with her to save Pure's life, making her a hybrid. Despite her lack of experience, Pure is quickly turned by Yuya into a powerful warrior thanks to a special training, during which she has learned to fight while instinctively obeying the commands Yuya sends her with a special dog whistle. She tends to trust the others easily (even if she acts with hostility against whoever she senses as a threat for Yuya, following her canine instinct to protect her owner), and despite everyone's skepticism she proves being a powerful and dangerous fighter. After winning the Second Killing Bites preliminary round, she's chosen to take part to the final tournament representing her school.

She is a Tasmanian devil Hybrid. She has a strong personality and her sole purpose is to become stronger than her idol Hitomi. Her dream comes true the moment they fight during the Second Killing Bites, becoming one of the few Hybrids that succeeds in seriously wounding Hitomi while in her final form. Sometimes irritable to Pure's attachment to her, she initially takes the duty to protect her only by Yuya's order, but with time she seems to start becoming attached to her. The Tasmanian devil in her DNA provides her with endless evolution abilities, making her body capable of increasing or decreasing her animal powers by its own according with the opponent's strength. Despite this, she's apparently killed during the second Killing Bites preliminary round by Nodoka. 

She is an Ibex Hybrid. She has an apatic personality, and since childhood she has always found at ease with high places, until when she met a young Hitomi and they became friends. Both her outstanding agility and ibex' DNA make her able to climb even the steepest slopes without problems, while her powerful horns (which are her pigtails while not transformed) are strong enough to be deadly dangerous for almost any other hybrid.

She is the granddaughter of Yozan and believes the Killing Bites have been corrupted by Shidoh's influence. After her defeat at the destroyal, the other Zaibatsu conspire to destroy the Mitsukado family, sending her in ruin and subsequently abandoning her in the hands of Yūgo Tani, who makes her his personal sex slave.

A civet hybrid that uses her pheromones to control others. She represents the Yatsubishi Zaibatsu.

A sadistic gecko hybrid who represents the Sumitomo Zaibatsu. After having been defeated by Taiga during the first destroyal she manages to survive the battle, only to be defeated again during the next Killing Bites preliminary round, this time by Haiji Gotoh.

He is the President of Mitsukado Zaibatsu. He is Yoko's Grandfather. After his death, the other Zaibatsu organize themselves to gain monopoly over the hybrids-making business, sending the Mitsukado in ruin.

A human hybrid born by Shidō's experiments of injecting human DNA into a South American sloth. The experiment gave her a human's body and intelligence, but she still presents some traits of her original being (for example, she tends to get tired quickly). In a second moment, Shidō injected her even the DNA of a megatherium, the prehistoric ancestor of the sloth, making her both the first hybrid with three different kinds of DNA and the first one made with the genes of an extinct species. During the Second Killing Bites' preliminary round, the Zaibatsu leaders secretly release her on the fighting field to test her strength, and even if she befriends Pure saving her from other participants she quickly goes berserk, revealing her true form.

A minor character used for comic relief after the credits. She has a crush on Hitomi and is portrayed as being similar in behavior to the Greater honeyguide, a species of bird thought to cooperate with honey badgers by leading them to bees nests. However, Oshie usually ends up injured as a result of being around Hitomi because, as the narrator frequently points out, Oshie is human, not a Therianthrope.

A Pangolin hybrid representing the Mitsukado Zaibatsu. He has an unusual fondness for trees and is known for being especially merciless against opponents who have damaged trees during the matches. 

A bespectacled young man and a Gorilla hybrid from the Mitsukado Zaibatsu.

He is a Bear hybrid specialising in Sumo Wrestling who represents the Mitsukado Zaibatsu.

He is a Cobra hybrid with a sadistic personality who enjoys sexually assaulting his female Hybrid opponents while in his transformed Cobra body. He represents the Sumitomo Zaibatsu. 

He is a Crocodile hybrid representing the Sumitomo Zaibatsu. 

A Lion hybrid representing the Mitsukado Zaibatsu. He was the first opponent Hitomi faces in the series. While ruthless in battle, he can be friendly outside of it.

Media

Manga
Killing Bites is written by Shinya Murata and illustrated by Kazuasa Sumita. It has been serialized in Hero's Inc. seinen manga magazine Monthly Hero's since November 30, 2013. The magazine ceased publication on October 30, 2020 and the series was transferred to Comiplex website, starting publication on November 27, 2020. Shogakukan has collected its chapters into individual tankōbon volumes. The first volume was released on September 5, 2014. As of July 29, 2021, eighteen volumes have been released. The manga has been licensed in English by Mangamo.

A spin-off manga series written and illustrated by Sumita, titled Hoshigarisugi Desho!? Inaba-san  (Desire Overload, Right Inaba!?), was launched on Wild Hero's website on August 21, 2020. The series will focus on the character, Inaba.

Volume list

Anime
A 12-episode anime television series adaptation by Liden Films aired from January 13 to March 31, 2018 on MBS TV's "Animeism" programming block. Amazon Video streamed the Director's Cut version worldwide. The four Blu-ray releases were released from March 28, 2018 to June 26, 2018. Each release has three episodes inside the disc for a total of 12 episodes. Sentai Filmworks has licensed the series for home video release in North America.

Episode list

Video game
A video game adaptation for the PlayStation 4 and PlayStation Vita was announced in 2015, developed by Nex Entertainment. The game was delayed in 2016 after the developer was dissolved, and the game's development was later suspended.

Notes

References

External links
  
  
 

Action anime and manga
Anime series based on manga
Animeism
Cancelled PlayStation 4 games
Cancelled PlayStation Vita games
Liden Films
Science fiction anime and manga
Seinen manga
Sentai Filmworks
Shogakukan manga